Red Bull Stratos was a high-altitude skydiving project involving Austrian skydiver Felix Baumgartner. On 14 October 2012, Baumgartner flew approximately  into the stratosphere over New Mexico, United States, in a helium balloon before free falling in a pressure suit and then parachuting to Earth. The total jump, from leaving the capsule to landing on the ground, lasted approximately ten minutes. While the free fall was initially expected to last between five and six minutes, Baumgartner deployed his parachute after 4 minutes and 19 seconds.

Reaching —Baumgartner broke the sound barrier on his descent, becoming the first human to do so without any form of engine power. Measurements show Baumgartner also broke two other world records. He also broke the record for the highest-altitude jump, set in 1960 by USAF Colonel Joseph Kittinger, who was Baumgartner's mentor and capsule communicator at mission control. These claims were verified by the Fédération Aéronautique Internationale (FAI).

Baumgartner's height record has since been surpassed by Alan Eustace.

History 
In January 2010, it was reported that Baumgartner was working with a team of scientists and sponsor Red Bull GmbH to attempt the highest sky-dive on record. By wearing the Equivital LifeMonitor, researchers were able to monitor Felix Baumgartner's physiological response within an extreme environment. Baumgartner was going to make the  jump from a capsule suspended from a balloon filled with helium, intending to become the first parachutist to break the sound barrier.
This would be possible because while the normal terminal velocity of a skydiver freeflying is about 320 km/h (200 mph or 90 m/s), the high altitude with less-dense atmosphere would decrease drag. On 12 October 2010, Red Bull announced it was placing the project on hold after Daniel Hogan filed a lawsuit in California Superior Court in Los Angeles, California, USA in April, claiming he originated the idea of the parachute dive from the edge of space in 2004 and that Red Bull stole the idea from him. The lawsuit was resolved out of court in June 2011 and on 5 February 2012, it was reported that the project would be resumed.

Preparation 

It took Baumgartner about 90 minutes to reach the target altitude and his free fall was estimated to have lasted three minutes and 48 seconds before his parachutes were deployed. Baumgartner landed safely near Roswell, New Mexico, USA. His top speed was an estimated  according to Brian Utley, an official observer on site. The jump represented a personal best for Baumgartner. Joseph Kittinger, who parachuted from 31,300 m (102,800 feet) in 1960, became involved with the mission to advise Baumgartner and to help gather scientific data on next-generation full pressure suits.

Mission

Aborted launch 
The project's original scheduled launch on the morning of 9 October 2012 was delayed five hours because of weather problems. Technicians at the launch site also found that one of the capsule's communication radios was faulty. At 11:42 MDT, the launch was aborted due to a  gust of wind at the launch site. The launch was rescheduled for the morning of 11 October, though the project's meteorologist announced that the date would again be postponed.

Launch 
The capsule was launched from Roswell International Air Center at 09:30 MDT (15:30 UTC) on 14 October 2012, which was also the 65th anniversary of Chuck Yeager's Bell X-1 flight. A valve in the balloon was used to vent gas to control the ascent.

Shortly after passing the Armstrong limit, Baumgartner expressed concerns that his visor heater was not functioning properly.  Mission Control continued with the mission, and 40 minutes later announced that the jump would continue regardless of the reported problem. An abort procedure—which would have seen helium vented from the balloon to allow the capsule to descend—was considered.

After approximately  hours of ascent, Baumgartner and mission control began the egress procedures.  This involved depressurisation of the capsule, detachment of his umbilical air supplies, and adjusting the capsule interior ready for decamp. As the final checks were being undertaken, Kittinger said to Baumgartner, "OK, we're getting serious now, Felix".

Jump and descent 
Fifteen minutes after the egress checks began, the pressure between the capsule and the outside stabilized and the door opened. One of the last items was for Baumgartner to enable his suit cameras.

Baumgartner dove forward off the ledge at 12:08 MDT (18:08 UTC); After 42 seconds of descent Baumgartner reached his maximum velocity—an unverified . An uncontrolled spin started within the first minute of the jump which could have been fatal, but it ended at 01:23 when Baumgartner regained stability, though in a later press conference he likened the fall in the suit to "swimming without feeling the water" as he could not feel the air to give him a sense of direction. Baumgartner had an abort switch that would have allowed deployment of a drogue parachute, which would have arrested the spin but also would have prevented him from breaking any speed records.

After 03:40 of free fall Baumgartner radioed to Mission Control that his visor was fogging up, echoing his earlier concerns about its heating. After 04:16 minutes of free fall he deployed his parachute, which opened and arrested freefall at 4:20 minutes. At the deployment altitude Baumgartner could have continued to fall safely for another 20 seconds, but it was difficult for him to verify his exact altitude. At 12:17 MDT (18:17 UTC), approximately 9 minutes after jumping from the capsule, Baumgartner landed on his feet in eastern New Mexico. Baumgartner dropped to his knees and punched the air before being met by ground crews. A helicopter was dispatched to return Baumgartner to the Roswell base.

According to YouTube the jump was viewed live by over 9.5 million users, setting a record for the "live stream with the most concurrent views ever on YouTube".

While the capsule could theoretically be reused, the balloon was only made for a single use.

Analysis 
On 22 February 2013, FAI announced that Baumgartner had broken three of the four planned records.

The jump records Baumgartner attained:
 Exit altitude of 
 Maximum vertical speed (without drogue) of 
 Vertical distance of freefall (without drogue) of

Timeline 

The timeline for the mission was split into eight stages. Stages 1 and 2 covered the balloon's ascent, stages 3–7 covered the descent and landing, and stage 8 covered the return of the balloon and capsule:
Launch of balloon with Baumgartner in capsule suspended below canopy
Completed at approximately 09:30 MDT (15:30 UTC)
Balloon reaches maximum altitude——after a 2.5-hour ascent
Completed ( reached)
Baumgartner de-pressurises the capsule, opens the door and jumps
Completed (jumped from capsule at approximately 12:07 MDT (18:07 UTC))
Achieved Mach 1.25——after approximately 00:40 of freefall
After approximately 3:30 of freefall, air resistance slows Baumgartner as the atmosphere becomes denser
Parachute deployed at 4:16 and fully opened by 4:19, earlier than scheduled, preventing the duration milestone from being reached
Completed
Approximately 5:00 of controlled parachute descent until landing
Completed at approximately 12:17 MDT (18:17 UTC)
Mission control remotely detach the balloon from the capsule; both descend to Earth to be recovered
Completed

The following table shows the ascent of the capsule from ground to top altitude in altitude (ft) and velocity (ft/min) versus time (min).

Scientific benefits 

There were many unknowns about what would happen with Baumgartner when he jumped, the biggest of which was what breaking the sound barrier would do to his body. Gathered information on the feasibility of high-altitude bailouts will be useful to the budding commercial space-flight industry. Jonathan Clark, medical director of the project, said: 

The project provided data for the development of high-performance, high-altitude parachute systems. It has been stated these will inform the development of new ideas for emergency evacuation from vehicles, such as spacecraft, passing through the stratosphere.

Controversy 
The 100 km altitude is also used as a defining line by the Fédération Aéronautique Internationale, which administers aeronautics records worldwide.

The FAA and NASA set the border to space at  altitude above sea level.

See also
Project Excelsior
Alan Eustace
Speed skydiving

References

External links 
Equivital Hidalgo 

Red Bull Stratos
Space Dive, Sunday, 11 November at 7 p.m. E/P on the National Geographic Channel. (2012)
Video (09:25) – Felix Jump – POV from Stratosphere (127,851 ft) – 14 October 2012.

Balloons (aeronautics)
Parachuting in the United States
Red Bull
Roswell, New Mexico
Space diving
2012 in New Mexico
2012 in aviation